Suvi, Şuvi or Shuvi may refer to:
Şuvi, Astara, a village and municipality in Azerbaijan
Şovu, a village and municipality in Azerbaijan
Suvi River, a river in western India
Suvi (novel), a novel by Oskar Luts
Summer (1976 film) (Suvi), a film based on the novel

People 
 Suvi Raj Grubb, a South-Indian record producer
 Suvi Koponen, a Finnish fashion model
 Suvi Mikkonen, a Finnish taekwondo practitioner
 Suvi-Anne Siimes, a Finnish politician
 Suvi Suresh, an Indian singer
 Suvi Teräsniska, a Finnish singer